Chuckles and Mr. Squeezy is the fifth studio album by American rock band Dredg, released on Superball Music. It was released on April 25, 2011 in the United Kingdom and most of Europe, and on May 3, 2011 for the United States.

Track listing

References

External links 
 http://www.dredg.com/

Dredg albums
2011 albums
Albums produced by Dan the Automator